AVer Information Inc. (TWSE: 3669) is an education, business communication and wireless presentation technology manufacturer headquartered in the Techeng District New Taipei City, Taiwan. AVer is best known for its Interactive Flat Panels, visualizers (document cameras) PTZ Cameras, USB video conferencing cameras, various camera support software as well as mobile device Charge Carts and Cabinets.

History

Guo Zhongsong founded AVerMedia Technology in 1990. In January 2008, AVer Information Inc. spun off from AVerMedia Information, Inc., which is affiliated to AVerMedia Group, to become an independent company focusing on Education and business markets. In 2010, AVer built a 450,000 sq. ft. building in New Taipei City, Taiwan for its Global Headquarters. On July 1, 2011, Yuanzhan separated from AVerMedia Group and changed the company's English name to AVer Information Inc.  AVer became a publicly listed company in Taiwan after they placed an initial public offering (IPO) on the Taiwan Stock Exchange on August 25, 2011.  In 2013, Aver expanded their operations to the United States to a new 63,000 Sq. Ft. office in Fremont, California.

 2008: AVer Information Inc. spun off from AVerMedia.
 2010: AVer built a 450,000 Sq. Ft. building in Taipei as the Global Headquarter.
 August 25, 2011: AVer became a publicly listed company in the Taiwan stock exchange (Taiwan Securities: 3669). 
 2012: In August, AVer launched a new generation of AVer SF2012H series webcams.
 2013: AVer expanded the US location to a new 63,000 Sq. Ft. office in Fremont, CA.
 2013: In August, AVer launched a new generation of high-definition video conferencing product AVer EVC130.
 2014: "User Experience Design Center" was established to provide an interactive product experience. 
 2014: In May, AVer launched AVer Chrome40C, a tablet and laptop charging cart.
 2014: In June, AVer launched the first 10-point online video conferencing system, the AVer EVC900, for small- and medium-sized enterprises.
 2017: AVer released CAM340 huddle room camera.
 2018: AVer launched its first all-in-one soundbar, the VB342.
 2019: AVer launched the EP65 a Zoom Certified All-In-One Interactive Touch Display Panel 
 2019: AVer launched the CAM340+, VB342+ Soundbar,  CAM520 PRO, and VC520 PRO for enterprise business.
 2019: VB342+ Soundbar becomes Zoom Certified.
 2020: CAM540, CAM340+, CAM520 PRO, VC520 PRO become Zoom Certified.
 2020: AVer CAM540 and CAM520 PRO become Certified for Microsoft Teams and Skype for Business.

Quality standards

AVer is ISO 9001/14001 and OHSAS 18001 certified.

Corporate Information

AVer Information's global operations are directed by co-founder and chairman Michael Kuo and president Andy Hsi from AVer's world headquarters in New Taipei City, Taiwan. The company has 7 branch offices located in the Netherlands, the United Kingdom, France, Spain, China, Japan and the United States as well as local sales representatives in Germany, Korea and Thailand. The United States branch office handles AVer's operations in the United States, Canada, and Latin America and is overseen by United States co-founder and president Arthur Pait.

References

2008 establishments in Taiwan
Manufacturing companies based in New Taipei
Companies listed on the Taiwan Stock Exchange
Electronics companies of Taiwan
Taiwanese brands
Technology companies established in 2008
Videotelephony